List of years in Art

Events in the year 1802 in Art.

Events
The Journal of the Royal Institution records one of the first experiments in photography.
Antonio Canova models the bust of Napoleon later used for his statue Napoleon as Mars the Peacemaker.
Marie Tussaud first exhibits her wax sculptures in London, having been commissioned during the Reign of Terror in France to make death masks of the victims.

Works

John Constable – Dedham Vale
François Fleury-Richard – Valentine of Milan weeping for the death of her husband Louis of Orléans
François Gérard – Madame Récamier
Anne-Louis Girodet de Roussy-Trioson – Apotheosis of French Heroes Who Died for the Fatherland during the War of Liberation
Christian Gottlieb Schick – Portrait of Wilhelmine Cotta (Staatsgalerie Stuttgart)
Manuel Tolsá – Equestrian statue of Charles IV (Mexico City)
John Trumbull – Self-portrait (Yale University Art Gallery)
Utamaro – Ten Forms of Feminine Physiognomy (print series)
Rafail's Cross (woodcarving, Rila Monastery, Bulgaria)

Births
May 20 – David Octavius Hill, Scottish painter and pioneer photographer (died 1870)
June 17 – Hermann Goldschmidt, German painter and astronomer (died 1866)
August 26 – Ludwig Michael Schwanthaler, German sculptor (died 1848)
December 25 – Richard Parkes Bonington, English landscape painter (died 1828)
Undated
Emma Fürstenhoff, Swedish florist (died 1871)
Henry Room, English portrait painter (died 1850)

Deaths
April 27 – Josef Kramolín, Czech fresco painter (born 1730)
June 20 – Gaetano Gandolfi, Bolognese painter (born 1734)
September 12 – Philip Jean, Jersey-born miniaturist painter (born 1755)
September 30 – Mikhail Kozlovsky, Russian Neoclassical sculptor (born 1753)
October 16 – Joseph Strutt, English engraver and antiquary (born 1749)
October 24 – John Ramage, Irish American goldsmith and miniaturist (born 1748)
November 9 – Thomas Girtin, English painter and etcher (born 1775)
November 15 – George Romney, English painter (born 1734)
December 5 – Lemuel Francis Abbott, English portrait painter (born 1760)
December 17 – Johannes Wiedewelt, Danish sculptor (born 1731)
December 27 – Jens Juel, Danish portrait painter (born 1745)
 date unknown
 Ivan Argunov, Russian painter (born 1727)
 James Basire, English engraver who apprenticed William Blake (born 1730)
 Giuseppe Canale, Italian painter and engraver (born 1725)
 Étienne de La Vallée Poussin, French history painter and creator of interior decorative schemes (born 1735)

 
Years of the 19th century in art
1800s in art